Vedenovka is a rural locality (a village) in Ashkadarsky Selsoviet, Sterlitamaksky District, Bashkortostan, Russia. The population was 73 as of 2010. There is 1 street.

Geography 
Vedenovka is located 29 km southwest of Sterlitamak (the district's administrative centre) by road. Novofyodorovskoye is the nearest rural locality.

References 

Rural localities in Sterlitamaksky District